Molla Ahmad (also Romanized as Mollā Aḩmad) is a village in Mehmandust Rural District, Kuraim District, Nir County, Ardabil Province, Iran. At the 2006 census, its population was 97, in 17 families.

References 

Towns and villages in Nir County